Tjaart du Plessis (born 9 July 1967) is a South African wrestler. He competed at the 1992 Summer Olympics and the 1996 Summer Olympics.

References

1967 births
Living people
South African male sport wrestlers
Olympic wrestlers of South Africa
Wrestlers at the 1992 Summer Olympics
Wrestlers at the 1996 Summer Olympics
Place of birth missing (living people)